This is the list of all Schalke 04's European matches.

Summary
Key
Pld = Matches played; W = Matches won; D = Matches drawn; L = Matches lost; GF = Goals for; GA = Goals against; GD = Goal difference

By competition

Defunct competitions indicated in italics.

By ground

By country of opposition

UEFA competitions

1950–2000

2000–2010

2010–present

Last updated: 12 March 2019Note: Schalke 04 score always listed first.

Non-UEFA competitions

Record players
Key
CL = Champions League, CL Q = Champions League Qualifying, EL / UC = Europa League / UEFA Cup, EL Q = Europa League Qualifying, CWC = Cup Winners' Cup

Most appearances

Top goalscorers
Numbers in brackets indicate appearances made. Ø = goals per game

References

External links
 Schalke 04 – all matches, all goals in European football (in German)

FC Schalke 04
German football clubs in international competitions